O Homem do Sputnik is a Brazilian comedy film from 1959 about a man (played by Oscarito) who tries to sell a UFO that lands on his house. Spies tail him, as they suspect it is a Russian Sputnik satellite. Norma Bengell also stars, performing a parody of Brigitte Bardot.

Plot 
UFO falls on a hillbilly's hencoop and he tries to sell it. Soon international missions are sent to the place, for there's a suspicion it might be the famous Russian satellite, the Sputnik.

References

1959 comedy films
Brazilian comedy films
1959 films